Mount Giona (also transliterated as Gkiona) is a mountain in Phocis, Central Greece. It is located between the mountains of Parnassus to the east, Vardousia to the west, and Oeta to the north. Known in classical antiquity as the Aselinon Oros ('moonless mountain'), it is the highest mountain south of Olympus and the fifth overall in Greece. Other peaks include the Perdika (Πέρδικα, 2,484 m), Tragonoros (Τραγονόρος, 2,456 m), Platyvouna or Plativouna (Πλατυβούνα, 2,316 m), Profitis Ilias (Προφήτης Ηλίας, 2,298 m), Kastro (Κάστρο, 2,176 m), Vraila (Βράϊλα, 2,177 m), Paliovouni (Παλιοβούνι, 2,122 m), Pyrgos (Πύργος, 2,066 m), Lyritsa (Λυρίτσα, 2,007 m), Botsikas (Μπότσικας, 1,945 m), Kokkinari (Κοκκινάρι, 1,908 m), Tychioni (Τυχιούνι, 1,842) and another Profitis Ilias (Προφήτης Ηλίας, 1,806 m). It is drained by the river Mornos to the west.

The nearest town is Amfissa, to the southeast. Smaller villages in the mountains are Kaloskopi in the northeast, Stromi in the north, Lefkaditi in the west and Agia Efthymia in the southeast.

References

External links 

 Greek Mountain Flora

Landforms of Phocis
Two-thousanders of Greece
Mountains of Central Greece